United Christian Party may refer to:
United Christian Party (Australia)
United Christian Party (Hungary)
United Christian Party (United States), a small political party organized in 1897